The Kenya Police Service is a national body in charge of law enforcement in Kenya. It is subordinate to National Police Service which is headed by Inspector General of Police who exercises independent command over the Service. Kenya Police is headed by Deputy Inspector General. Kenya Police is divided into Service Headquarters in Nairobi, Formations, General Duty Commands and Training Institutions.

Administration Police Service is commanded through a hierarchy separate from that of the Kenya Police. For other state security bodies see Law enforcement in Kenya. Recruitment to the police service is done on yearly basis.

History

The Kenya police force was established as a British colonial police force in 1907. From the 1887 to 1902 policing was provided by the East Africa Trading Company. After 1902 the Kenya-Uganda Railway introduced their own police units.

In 1906 the Police Ordinance was established to create a new force in 1907, the Nairobi Mounted Police within the jurisdiction of the East Africa Protectorate. The current force's name came into effect in 1920 with the newly created British Kenya Colony.

The colonial force was made up mainly of British and Indian recruits as senior officers and Africans amongst lower ranks.

Following Kenya's independence, the British officers were replaced with local Kenyan members.

Structure

General 
Kenya Police is divided into General Duty and Formations. General Duty comprises components with regions being the largest and police patrol bases being the smallest.

Regional Police Commander is in charge of a Region (formerly Provinces), County Police Commander is in charge of Officers in the County, Sub-County Police Commander Superintends Sub-County (previously called District). Officer Commanding Station (OCS) is in charge of a Police Station in a Ward and oversees all its Police Posts and Patrol Bases (Ward Commander).

Formations
The Kenya Police formations/Units are headed by commandants/directors, who hold the rank of Senior Assistant Inspector General, Assistant Inspector General of Police (AIG)or Commissioner of Police (CP).

These formations are listed as under:

 General Service Unit (GSU): both headquarters and training school are in Nairobi ; the Commandant is Douglas Kanja.
Diplomatic Police Unit: It is headed by a Commandant from its Nairobi headquarters.
 
 Traffic Police Department: It is headed by a Commandant from its Nairobi offices.
 
Kenya Police College: It is headed by a Commandant from its headquarters at Kiganjo in Nyeri County.

 Kenya Police Air Wing: It is headed by a Commandant from its Nairobi headquarters.
Presidential Escort Unit: It is headed by Commandant from its Statehouse Nairobi headquarters.
Railways Police: It is headed by a Commandant from its Nairobi headquarters.

 Kenya Police Dog Unit: It is headed by a Commandant from its Nairobi headquarters.

 Tourist Police Unit:  It is headed by a Commandant from its offices in Old Nairobi Area Provincial Police headquarters in Nairobi. 
 Kenya Airports Police Unit: It is headed by a Commandant from its Nairobi headquarters and three divisions (Nairobi, Eldoret, Moi airports).

 Maritime Police Unit: It is headed by a Commanding Officer from its headquarters at Kilindini Harbour in Mombasa .

Police ranks

The Kenya Police wear badges of rank on the shoulders (Inspector-General – Inspector) and sleeve (senior sergeant – constable) of their uniform to denote their rank. In line with the ongoing reforms, the uniforms committee is also working on new insignia for the revised rank structure, which will have to be approved by the National Police Service Commission.
The order of Kenya Police ranks is as follows:

 Inspector-General (formerly Commissioner of Police) – equivalent to the 2-star general in the Kenya Defence Forces (KDF).

 Deputy Inspector-General – equivalent to the one-star rank -brigadier general in the KDF

 Senior Assistant Inspector-General – equivalent to colonel in the KDF.

 Assistant Inspector-General – equivalent to the lieutenant colonel in the KDF

 Commissioner of Police 
 Senior Superintendent – equivalent to major in the KDF

 Superintendent – equivalent to captain in the KDF

 Assistant Superintendent – equivalent to lieutenant in the KDF

 Chief Inspector – equivalent to Warrant Officer 1 in the KDF

 Inspector – equivalent to Warrant Officer 2 or sergeant major in the KDF

 Senior Sergeant – equivalent to senior sergeant in the KDF

 Sergeant – equivalent to sergeant in the KDF

 Corporal

Constable – equivalent to private in the KDF
Former Kenya Police ranks and  Kenya Police – Ranks and Insignia  can be found at this reference.

Commissioners of Police & Inspectors-General

From 1906 to 1964 the force was headed by British officers. In 2012, the position of Inspector General was introduced to head the newly created National Police Service. The current Inspector General is Joseph Koome who is the fourth holder of the position.

The following officers have to date served in the capacity of Commissioner of Police:
 Bernard Hinga 1964–1978
 Ben Gethi 1978–1982
 Bernard Njinu 1982–1988
 Phillip Kilonzo 1988–1993
 Shedrack Kiruki 1993–1996
 Duncan Wachira 1996–1998
 Philemon Abong’o 1998–2002
 Edwin Nyaseda 2002–2003
 Major General Mohammed Hussein Ali 2004–2009
 Mathew Kirai Iteere 2009–2012
 Grace Kaindi 2013-2015
 Joel Kitili 2015-2018
 Edward N. Mbugua 2018 to date

The following officers have served as Inspector-General:
 David Mwole Kimaiyo 2012–2014
 Acting Inspector-General Samuel Arachi Deputy Inpsector General-Administration Police Service 31 December 2014 – 11 March 2015
 Joseph Kipchirchir Boinett 11 March 2015 – March 2019
 Hillary Nzioki Mutyambai 8 April 2019

Ongoing changes
Following the promulgation of the new Constitution of Kenya on 27 August 2010, as laid down in Chapter 17 Part 4, the Kenyan police forces is undergoing a series of reforms. Hence called The Kenya Police Service, it is now headed by a Deputy Inspector-General and the division of its functions are organised to take into account the devolved structure of government in Kenya.

In the ongoing changes that started in 2018, police operational command was aligned police with existing administrative boundaries to create a unified command as follows:-

1. Regional Police Commander (RPC)

2. County Police Commander (CPC)

3. Sub County Police Commander (SPC)

4. Officer in charge Police Station ( OCS)

The following positions were therefore abolished:-

1. APS Regional Commander

2. KPS Regional Commander

3. DCI Regional Commander

4. County Coordinating Commander

5. KPS County Commander

6. APS County Commander

7. DCI County Commander

8. APS Sub County Commander

9. DCI Sub County Commander

10. KPS Officer Commanding Police Divisions

11.District Administration Police Commander

Consequently, the number of commanders were reduced from 168 to 56 Commanders.

Equipment

The equipment of the Kenya Police and General Service Unit (GSU), a paramilitary wing of the Kenyan Police, comprises:

Aircraft
 2 Cessna fixed wing aircraft (United States), the latest (2011) being a Cessna 208 Caravan light aircraft

 1 AS350 B3e Ecureuil helicopter (France) (January 2012), June 2012, crashed, total loss, with 6 fatalities.

 4 Mil Mi-17 helicopters (Russia)

 4 Bell 206 helicopters (United States)
 3 AW139 helicopters (Italy), one of which crashed without fatalities resulting in being written off
 1 AW119 Koala helicopter (Italy)

Weapons

 G3 Rifle
 AK-47 Rifle
 MP5 Submachine Gun 
 Scorpion EVO 3 A1 Submachine gun
M16 assault rifles
M4 carbines
 Glock Pistol
 Browning Pistol
 Jericho 94 Pistol
 CZ 75 Pistol
M79 grenade launchers
M67 recoilless rifle

 Vehicles

 30 VN-4 Armoured Personnel Carriers (GSU)
Troop carrying vehicles
Buses 
Vans
Patrol cars – 4 x 4
Patrol Cars-saloon 
Surveillance Vehicles 4 × 4 with radio
Motorcycles
M/Vs Civil disturbance

Break downs/ Recovery Vehicles
Fire Engines
Water Bowsers 
Fuel Tankers
Boats

Societal Impact

Following a history of human right abuses by the Kenya Police, efforts are being made to reform the force. Kenyan policemen are poorly paid and have to make use with archaic housing that has not been expanded or renovated since the 1970s. This has made them very susceptible to corruption and crime. Extortion and bribery are known practices and the Kenyan people rank the police among the most corrupt bodies in the country.
In July 2010 the Minister, Prof. George Saitoti, announced a 28% pay increase for junior officers and a 25% pay increase for senior officers. This reform means that the most junior officer, a police constable, shall receive KSh.21,000/= per month including allowances.

See also
 Administration Police
 Kenya Defence Forces
 Kenya Coast Guard Service
 Corruption in Kenya
For other state security bodies see Law enforcement in Kenya

References

External links
 Kenya Police website
 Administration Police

Law enforcement agencies of Kenya
Organizations established in 1920